In coding theory, burst error-correcting codes employ methods of correcting burst errors, which are errors that occur in many consecutive bits rather than occurring in bits independently of each other.

Many codes have been designed to correct random errors.  Sometimes, however, channels may introduce errors which are localized in a short interval. Such errors occur in a burst (called burst errors) because they occur in many consecutive bits. Examples of burst errors can be found extensively in storage mediums. These errors may be due to physical damage such as scratch on a disc or a stroke of lightning in case of wireless channels. They are not independent; they tend to be spatially concentrated. If one bit has an error, it is likely that the adjacent bits could also be corrupted. The methods used to correct random errors are inefficient to correct burst errors.

Definitions

A burst of length 

For example,  is a burst of length 

Although this definition is sufficient to describe what a burst error is, the majority of the tools developed for burst error correction rely on cyclic codes. This motivates our next definition.

A cyclic burst of length 

An error vector  is called a cyclic burst error of length  if its nonzero components are confined to  cyclically consecutive components. For example, the previously considered error vector , is a cyclic burst of length , since we consider the error starting at position  and ending at position . Notice the indices are -based, that is, the first element is at position .

For the remainder of this article, we will use the term burst to refer to a cyclic burst, unless noted otherwise.

Burst description 
It is often useful to have a compact definition of a burst error, that encompasses not only its length, but also the pattern, and location of such error.

Notice that such description is not unique, because  describes the same burst error. To remedy the issues that arise by the ambiguity of burst descriptions with the theorem below, however before doing so we need a definition first.

Definition. The number of symbols in a given error pattern  is denoted by 

A corollary of the above theorem is that we cannot have two distinct burst descriptions for bursts of length

Cyclic codes for burst error correction

Now, we can think of words as polynomials over  where the individual symbols of a word correspond to the different coefficients of the polynomial. To define a cyclic code, we pick a fixed polynomial, called generator polynomial. The codewords of this cyclic code are all the polynomials that are divisible by this generator polynomial.

Codewords are polynomials of degree . Suppose that the generator polynomial  has degree . Polynomials of degree  that are divisible by  result from multiplying  by polynomials of degree . We have  such polynomials. Each one of them corresponds to a codeword. Therefore,  for cyclic codes.

Cyclic codes are considered optimal for burst error detection since they meet this upper bound:

If the remainder is zero (i.e. if the word is divisible by ), then it is a valid codeword. Otherwise, report an error. To correct this error, subtract this remainder from the transmitted word.

By the upper bound on burst error detection, we know that a cyclic code can not detect all bursts of length . However cyclic codes can indeed detect most bursts of length . Over binary alphabets, there exist  bursts of length . Therefore, the detection failure probability is very small assuming a uniform distribution over all bursts of length .

We now consider a fundamental theorem about cyclic codes that will aid in designing efficient burst-error correcting codes, by categorizing bursts into different cosets.

Burst error correction bounds

Upper bounds on burst error detection and correction

By upper bound, we mean a limit on our error detection ability that we can never go beyond. In other words, what is the upper bound on the length  of bursts that we can detect using any  code? The following theorem provides an answer to this question.

The following theorem provides a preliminary answer to this question:

A stronger result is given by the Rieger bound:

Definition. A linear burst-error-correcting code achieving the above Rieger bound is called an optimal burst-error-correcting code.

Further bounds on burst error correction 

There is more than one upper bound on the achievable code rate of linear block codes for multiple phased-burst correction (MPBC). One such bound is constrained to a maximum correctable cyclic burst length within every subblock, or equivalently a constraint on the minimum error free length or gap within every phased-burst. This bound, when reduced to the special case of a bound for single burst correction, is the Abramson bound (a corollary of the Hamming bound for burst-error correction) when the cyclic burst length is less than half the block length.

Remark.  is called the redundancy of the code and in an alternative formulation for the Abramson's bounds is

Fire codesMoon, Todd K. Error Correction Coding: Mathematical Methods and Algorithms. Hoboken, NJ: Wiley-Interscience, 2005. Print
While cyclic codes in general are powerful tools for detecting burst errors, we now consider a family of binary cyclic codes named Fire Codes, which possess good single burst error correction capabilities. By single burst, say of length , we mean that all errors that a received codeword possess lie within a fixed span of  digits.

Define the Fire Code  by the following generator polynomial:

We will show that  is an -burst-error correcting code.

If we can show that all bursts of length  or less occur in different cosets, we can use them as coset leaders that form correctable error patterns. The reason is simple: we know that each coset has a unique syndrome decoding associated with it, and if all bursts of different lengths occur in different cosets, then all have unique syndromes, facilitating error correction.

Proof of Theorem
Then,  is a valid codeword (since both terms are in the same coset). Without loss of generality, pick . We rewrite the polynomial  as follows:

Notice that at the second manipulation, we introduced the term  . Applying the division theorem again, we see that there exists a polynomial  with degree  such that:

Then we may write:

Notice that in the expansion:

Since , we have . But  is irreducible, therefore   and  must be relatively prime.

Example: 5-burst error correcting fire code
With the theory presented in the above section, consider the construction of a  -burst error correcting Fire Code. Remember that to construct a Fire Code, we need an irreducible polynomial , an integer , representing the burst error correction capability of our code, and we need to satisfy the property that  
With these requirements in mind, consider the irreducible polynomial , and let . Thus,

is a Fire Code generator. In other words,  . Thus, the Fire Code above is a cyclic code capable of correcting any burst of length  or less.

Binary Reed–Solomon codes
Certain families of codes, such as Reed–Solomon, operate on alphabet sizes larger than binary. This property awards such codes powerful burst error correction capabilities. Each symbol of the alphabet can be represented by  bits.

The reason such codes are powerful for burst error correction is that each symbol is represented by  bits, and in general, it is irrelevant how many of those  bits are erroneous; whether a single bit, or all of the  bits contain errors, from a decoding perspective it is still a single symbol error. In other words, since burst errors tend to occur in clusters, there is a strong possibility of several binary errors contributing to a single symbol error.

Notice that a burst of  errors can affect at most  symbols, and a burst of  can affect at most  symbols. Then, a burst of  can affect at most  symbols; this implies that a -symbols-error correcting code can correct a burst of length at most .

In general, a -error correcting Reed–Solomon code over  can correct any combination of

or fewer bursts of length , on top of being able to correct -random worst case errors.

An example of a binary RS code
This code was employed by NASA in their  Cassini-Huygens spacecraft. It is capable of correcting  symbol errors. Each symbol will be written using  bits. Therefore, the Binary RS code will have  as its parameters. It is capable of correcting any single burst of length .

Interleaved codes
Interleaving is used to convert convolutional codes from random error correctors to burst error correctors. The basic idea behind the use of interleaved codes is to jumble symbols at the transmitter. This leads to randomization of bursts of received errors which are closely located and we can then apply the analysis for random channel. Thus, the main function performed by the interleaver at transmitter is to alter the input symbol sequence. At the receiver, the deinterleaver will alter the received sequence to get back the original unaltered sequence at the transmitter.

Burst error correcting capacity of interleaver

Block interleaver
The figure below shows a 4 by 3 interleaver.

The above interleaver is called as a block interleaver. Here, the input symbols are written sequentially in the rows and the output symbols are obtained by reading the columns sequentially. Thus, this is in the form of  array. Generally,  is length of the codeword.

Efficiency of block interleaver: It is found by taking ratio of burst length where decoder may fail to the interleaver memory. Thus, we can formulate  as

Drawbacks of block interleaver : As it is clear from the figure, the columns are read sequentially, the receiver can interpret single row only after it receives complete message and not before that. Also, the receiver requires a considerable amount of memory in order to store the received symbols and has to store the complete message. Thus, these factors give rise to two drawbacks, one is the latency and other is the storage (fairly large amount of memory). These drawbacks can be avoided by using the convolutional interleaver described below.

Convolutional interleaver
Cross interleaver is a kind of multiplexer-demultiplexer system. In this system, delay lines are used to progressively increase length. Delay line is basically an electronic circuit used to delay the signal by certain time duration. Let  be the number of delay lines and  be the number of symbols introduced by each delay line. Thus, the separation between consecutive inputs =  symbols. Let the length of codeword  Thus, each symbol in the input codeword will be on distinct delay line. Let a burst error of length  occur.

Efficiency of cross interleaver: It is found by taking the ratio of burst length where decoder may fail to the interleaver memory. In this case, the memory of interleaver can be calculated as

Thus, we can formulate  as follows:

Performance of cross interleaver : As shown in the above interleaver figure, the output is nothing but the diagonal symbols generated at the end of each delay line. In this case, when the input multiplexer switch completes around half switching, we can read first row at the receiver. Thus, we need to store maximum of around half message at receiver in order to read first row. This drastically brings down the storage requirement by half. Since just half message is now required to read first row, the latency is also reduced by half which is good improvement over the block interleaver. Thus, the total interleaver memory is split between transmitter and receiver.

Applications

Compact disc 

Without error correcting codes, digital audio would not be technically feasible. The Reed–Solomon codes can correct a corrupted symbol with a single bit error just as easily as it can correct a symbol with all bits wrong. This makes the RS codes particularly suitable for correcting burst errors. By far, the most common application of RS codes is in compact discs. In addition to basic error correction provided by RS codes, protection against burst errors due to scratches on the disc is provided by a cross interleaver.

Current compact disc digital audio system was developed by N. V. Philips of The Netherlands and Sony Corporation of Japan (agreement signed in 1979).

A compact disc comprises a 120 mm aluminized disc coated with a clear plastic coating, with spiral track, approximately 5 km in length, which is optically scanned by a laser of wavelength ~0.8 μm, at a constant speed of ~1.25 m/s.  For achieving this constant speed, rotation of the disc is varied from ~8 rev/s while scanning at the inner portion of the track to ~3.5 rev/s at the outer portion.  Pits and lands are the depressions (0.12 μm deep) and flat segments constituting the binary data along the track (0.6 μm width).

The CD process can be abstracted as a sequence of the following sub-processes:
 Channel encoding of source of signals
 Mechanical sub-processes of preparing a master disc, producing user discs and sensing the signals embedded on user discs while playing – the channel
 Decoding the signals sensed from user discs

The process is subject to both burst errors and random errors. Burst errors include those due to disc material (defects of aluminum reflecting film, poor reflective index of transparent disc material), disc production (faults during disc forming and disc cutting etc.), disc handling (scratches – generally thin, radial and orthogonal to direction of recording) and variations in play-back mechanism. Random errors include those due to jitter of reconstructed signal wave and interference in signal. CIRC (Cross-Interleaved Reed–Solomon code) is the basis for error detection and correction in the CD process. It corrects error bursts up to 3,500 bits in sequence (2.4 mm in length as seen on CD surface) and compensates for error bursts up to 12,000 bits (8.5 mm) that may be caused by minor scratches.

Encoding: Sound-waves are sampled and converted to digital form by an A/D converter. The sound wave is sampled for amplitude (at 44.1 kHz or 44,100 pairs, one each for the left and right channels of the stereo sound). The amplitude at an instance is assigned a binary string of length 16. Every second of sound recorded results in 44,100 × 32 = 1,411,200 bits (176,400 bytes) of data. The 1.41 Mbit/s sampled data stream passes through the error correction system eventually getting converted to a stream of 1.88 Mbit/s.

Input for the encoder consists of input frames each of 24 8-bit symbols  (12 16-bit samples from the A/D converter, 6 each from left and right data (sound) sources).

Initially, the bytes are permuted to form new frames represented by  where represent -th left and right samples from the frame after 2 intervening frames.

This is two-error-correcting, being of minimum distance 5. This adds 4 bytes of redundancy,  forming a new frame:  . The resulting 28-symbol codeword is passed through a (28.4) cross interleaver leading to 28 interleaved symbols. These are then passed through C1 (32,28,5) RS code, resulting in codewords of 32 coded output symbols. Further regrouping of odd numbered symbols of a codeword with even numbered symbols of the next codeword is done to break up any short bursts that may still be present after the above 4-frame delay interleaving. Thus, for every 24 input symbols there will be 32 output symbols giving . Finally one byte of control and display information is added. Each of the 33 bytes is then converted to 17 bits through EFM (eight to fourteen modulation) and addition of 3 merge bits. Therefore, the frame of six samples results in 33 bytes × 17 bits (561 bits) to which are added 24 synchronization bits and 3 merging bits yielding a total of 588 bits.

Decoding: The CD player (CIRC decoder) receives the 32 output symbol data stream.  This stream passes through the decoder D1 first. It is up to individual designers of CD systems to decide on decoding methods and optimize their product performance.  Being of minimum distance 5 The D1, D2 decoders can each correct a combination of   errors and  erasures such that . In most decoding solutions, D1 is designed to correct single error. And in case of more than 1 error, this decoder outputs 28 erasures. The deinterleaver at the succeeding stage distributes these erasures across 28 D2 codewords. Again in most solutions, D2 is set to deal with erasures only (a simpler and less expensive solution). If more than 4 erasures were to be encountered, 24 erasures are output by D2. Thereafter, an error concealment system attempts to interpolate (from neighboring symbols) in case of uncorrectable symbols, failing which sounds corresponding to such erroneous symbols get muted.

Performance of CIRC: CIRC conceals long bust errors by simple linear interpolation. 2.5 mm of track length (4000 bits) is the maximum completely correctable burst length. 7.7 mm track length (12,300 bits) is the maximum burst length that can be interpolated. Sample interpolation rate is one every 10 hours at Bit Error Rate (BER)  and 1000 samples per minute at BER =   Undetectable error samples (clicks): less than one every 750 hours at BER =  and negligible at BER = .

See also
 Error detection and correction
 Error-correcting codes with feedback
 Code rate
 Reed–Solomon error correction

References

Coding theory
Error detection and correction
Computer errors